Community rail in Britain is the support of railway lines and stations by local organisations, usually through community rail partnerships (CRPs) comprising railway operators, local councils, and other community organisations, and rail user groups (RUGs). Community railways are managed to fit local circumstances recognising the need to increase revenue, reduce costs, increase community involvement and support social and economic development. The Community Rail Network (CRN), formerly known as the Association of Community Rail Partnerships (ACoRP), supports its fifty or so member CRPs and also offers assistance to voluntary station friends groups that support their local stations through the station adoption scheme. Since 2005 the Department for Transport has formally designated a number of railway lines as community rail schemes in order to recognise the need for different, more appropriate standards than are applied to main line railway routes, and therefore make them more cost effective.

Community Rail Partnerships and Rail User Groups

Station Friends

International members

 DHR India Support Group
 Nenagh Rail Partnership
 Washington Area Rail Passengers Association

Reciprocal membership
The Association of Community Rail Partnerships has reciprocal membership with:

 Campaign for Better Transport
 Community Transport Association
 Development Trusts Association
 Heritage Railway Association
 Sustrans
 Transform Scotland

Designated Lines

The Department for Transport announced a pilot project in 2005 under their Community Rail Development Strategy, with the intention of having seven differing lines (Abbey Line, Esk Valley Line, Looe Valley Line, Penistone Line, Poacher Line, St Ives Bay Line, and Tamar Valley Line) test out different types of community rail schemes. The aims of these schemes are to:

 establish the contribution of Community Rail Development in achieving locally set objectives such as reducing road congestion and increasing accessibility
 establish the costs for the line and services
 establish the effectiveness of different methods for reducing the net financial loss of Community Rail lines by increasing revenue and reducing costs where practicable

Designation does not physically separate a line from the rest of the network or remove it from either Network Rail or franchise operation. It is not generally intended to be used as a mechanism to reopen lines or create "microfranchises", although these options may be investigated on some routes.

In addition each line has a remit agreed in a route prospectus which gives more detailed aims and objectives for each scheme, such as infrastructure improvements, new ticketing arrangements, or cooperation with other local transport operators.

The DfT has identified about fifty routes in England and Wales that would benefit from designation, covering 10% of Network Rail and some 390 stations. Some routes will only be designated as community rail services (rather than community rail lines) as the infrastructure may be used by other operators in a way that precludes designation. Not all of the CRPs mentioned above have been designated. Those that have so far are:

See also
 Third-sector railway – a type of railway company or line in Japan that operates in a somewhat similar fashion to UK-style community rail especially in rural areas, typically involving prefectural and/or municipal governments as well as private companies forming small operating companies to take over and operate otherwise low-patronage and unprofitable rail lines spun off from larger rail companies. See also: List of third-sector railway lines in Japan

External links
 Community Rail Network
 Department for Transport, Community Rail
 Network Rail community railways page

Passenger rail transport in the United Kingdom
Community railway lines in the United Kingdom